Surendra Lath (born 30 November 1949) is an Indian politician of the Bharatiya Janata Party. He served one term (3 April 2002 – 2 April 2008) as a member of the Parliament of India representing Orissa in the Rajya Sabha, the upper house of the Indian Parliament.

References

Bharatiya Janata Party politicians from Odisha
Rajya Sabha members from Odisha
1949 births
Living people